"Sign Your Name" is a song written and performed by American singer-songwriter Terence Trent D'Arby (now known as Sananda Maitreya), released as the fourth single from his debut album, Introducing the Hardline According to Terence Trent D'Arby (1987). The song was an international success, reaching number two on the UK Singles Chart in early 1988 and number four on the US Billboard Hot 100. It was remixed by Lee "Scratch" Perry for some European releases. The music video was directed by Vaughan Arnell and was premiered in January 1988.  The music video features model Kelly Brennan.

Critical reception
Max Bell from Number One noted that the song finds D'Arby "in his quiet, sensitive, loving disguise, as opposed to his crafty, naughty, whoopsadaisy ma'am alter ego." He also felt that "Sign Your Name" "testifies at least to a knowledge of soul", and concluded, "From a Heaven 17 influenced beginning a fair single starts to brood but this could be a sucker punch rather than a knockout." Roger Morton from Record Mirror commented, "'Bop shoo wop wop/Bop shoo wap wap'. Terence has joined Showaddywaddy? Sadly not. This is the fourth single from the Hardline album, a crooner not a rasper, with some fine quavering from Tel's tonsils and a rhythm closely related to that of Scritti Politti's 'The Sweetest Girl'." Another editor, James Hamilton, wrote in his dance column, "Moodily shuffling sad 109/-0bpm lament, not really for floors".

Track listings
 7" single
 "Sign Your Name" – 4:45
 "Greasy Chicken" – 4:40

Charts

Weekly charts

Year-end charts

Certifications

Sheryl Crow version

Sheryl Crow released her rendition of the song in 2010 as the second single from her eighth studio album, 100 Miles from Memphis. It features Justin Timberlake on background vocals. The music video, directed by Wayne Isham, was released on September 16, 2010 through Crow's VEVO account.

Charts

References

1987 songs
1988 singles
Columbia Records singles
Irish Singles Chart number-one singles
Sheryl Crow songs
Soul ballads
Pop ballads
Songs written by Terence Trent D'Arby
Music videos directed by Wayne Isham
Terence Trent D'Arby songs
A&M Records singles
2010 singles
1980s ballads